Fuller is an unincorporated community in Crawford County, Kansas, United States.

History
Fuller was a mining town on the Missouri Pacific Railroad.

A post office was opened in Fuller in 1894, and remained in operation until it was discontinued in 1914.

References

Further reading

External links
 Crawford County maps: Current, Historic, KDOT

Unincorporated communities in Crawford County, Kansas
Unincorporated communities in Kansas